The 2000–01 Yugoslav Basketball Cup was the is the 36th season of the  Yugoslav men's national basketball cup tournament. The tournament will be held in Vršac from 5–8 April 2001.

Venue

Qualified teams

Bracket
Source

Quarterfinals

Semifinals

Final

See also 
 2000–01 YUBA League

References

External links 
 History of Radivoj Korać Cup

2000–01 in Yugoslav basketball
Yugoslavia